The 2012 6 Hours of Donington was an auto race held at the Donington Park Circuit, Leicestershire, United Kingdom on 13–15 July 2012.  It was the second round of the 2012 European Le Mans Series season, and the first time that the European Le Mans Series held the 6 Hours of Donington since 2006.  The race was won by Olivier Pla, Demitri Enjalbert, and Bertrand Baguette driving for OAK Racing in a Morgan-Nissan.

Qualifying

Qualifying result
Pole position in each class are marked in bold.

Note: The No. 66 JMW Ferrari was moved to the back of the starting grid for substituting a driver after the qualifying session.

Race

Race result
Class winners in bold.  Cars failing to complete 70% of winner's distance marked as Not Classified (NC).

References

Donington
Donington
6 Hours of Donington
6 Hours of Donington